Huguette Duflos (24 August 1887, Limoges – 12 April 1982, Paris) was a French stage and film actress.

Life 

In 1910, she married the actor Raphaël Duflos, from whom she was divorced around 1928. Initially a theatrical performer with the Comédie-Française, Duflor then embarked on a film career.

In 1931, Duflos was attacked by Frenchwoman Marguerite Pantaine outside the Theatre St. Georges in Paris. Pantaine was later treated by Jacques Lacan and became the subject of his doctoral thesis.

Selected filmography
 The Assassination of the Duke of Guise (1908)
 In Old Alsace (1920)
 The Flower of the Indies (1921)
 Koenigsmark (1923)
 The Mysteries of Paris (1924)
 The Princess and the Clown (1924)
 The Man with the Hispano (1926)
 Der Rosenkavalier (1926)
 Yasmina (1927)
 Palaces (1927)
 Le procès de Mary Dugan (1930)
 The Mystery of the Yellow Room (1930)
 The Perfume of the Lady in Black (1931)
 Martha (1935)
 Maman Colibri (1937)
 The Train for Venice (1938)
 The Captain (1946)
 Jupiter (1952)
 Girl on the Road (1962)

Bibliography
 Jung, Uli & Schatzberg, Walter. Beyond Caligari: The Films of Robert Wiene. Berghahn Books, 1999.

External links

1887 births
1982 deaths
French stage actresses
French film actresses
French silent film actresses
People from Limoges
Sociétaires of the Comédie-Française
20th-century French actresses
Burials at Batignolles Cemetery